Prindiville is a surname. Notable people with the surname include:

Kevin Prindiville (born 1949), Australian cricketer, brother of Terry
Steve Prindiville (born 1968), English footballer
Terry Prindiville (born 1942), Australian cricketer

English-language surnames